The Wisconsin Exposition Center is an exhibit hall and exposition facility located on the grounds of the Wisconsin State Fair Park in the Milwaukee suburb of West Allis, Wisconsin and commonly referred to as the "Expo Center". It is owned and operated by the State of Wisconsin and staffed by Wisconsin State Fair Park employees.

Events
The venue primarily hosts consumer shows, trade shows, food functions, and other public events.

The Expo Center hosts exhibits and entertainment during the 11-day Wisconsin State Fair as well as several annual events, including The Wonderful World of Weddings, the Milwaukee Boat Show, RV and Camping Show, the Milwaukee Journal Sentinel Sports Show, The Journal Sentinel Golf Show, the NARI Home Improvement Show, the Wisconsin Realtors' Home and Garden Show, Trainfest, and Holiday Folk Fair.

History
The Expo Center was built in 2002 to replace the previous exhibit halls at State Fair Park.

In 2007, the Expo Center received a Travel Green Wisconsin certification, which is a recognition of tourism-related businesses that reduce their environmental impact through operations and other improvements.

References

External links
 Wisconsin Exposition Center web site

Buildings and structures in Milwaukee County, Wisconsin
Convention centers in Wisconsin
Tourist attractions in Milwaukee County, Wisconsin
2002 establishments in Wisconsin
Wisconsin State Fair